Nazario Belmar Martínez (25 October 1919, in Elda – 9 July 1980, in Madrid) was a Spanish footballer, film producer and lawyer.

A midfielder, Belmar began playing at CD Eldense before the Spanish Civil War and, after, at Hércules CF. He signed with Real Madrid CF when he was 19. In a match with Real Betis in the 1946–47 season, he was seriously injured and he had to announce his retirement.

In 1957 he established Naga Films with Marcelino Galatas Rentería, making films as El verdugo with Rafael Azcona and Luis García Berlanga. Because of the Spanish television pressions, he abandoned Naga Films to establish in 1964 Belmar P.C., filming Pedro Lazaga's Un vampiro para dos. Finally, in 1965 he abandoned this career.

Career statistics
Source:

Filmography
 La muerte silba un blues (1964)
 The Executioner (1963)
 La becerrada (1963)
 Aprendiendo a morir (1962)
 Sabían demasiado (1962)

References

External links
 
 LFP database

1919 births
1980 deaths
People from Elda
Association football midfielders
Footballers from the Valencian Community
Spanish footballers
La Liga players
CD Eldense footballers
Hércules CF players
CE Sabadell FC footballers
Real Madrid CF players
Spanish film producers
Sportspeople from the Province of Alicante